Barany may refer to the following places:
Barany, Kuyavian-Pomeranian Voivodeship (north-central Poland)
Barany, Łódź Voivodeship (central Poland)
Barany, Ełk County in Warmian-Masurian Voivodeship (north Poland)
Barany, Olecko County in Warmian-Masurian Voivodeship (north Poland)

See also 

Bárány (disambiguation)